Society of Composers, Authors and Music Publishers of Canada v. Canadian Ass'n of Internet Providers 2 S.C.R. 427,  - also known as the Tariff 22 case - is a leading decision by the Supreme Court of Canada on Internet service provider (ISP) liability for copyright infringement. The Court found that there is no liability for information found in web caches. An ISP's liability depends on whether it limits itself to "a conduit" or a content-neutral function and is not dependent on where the ISP is located.

Background
In 1995 the Society of Composers, Authors, and Music Publishers of Canada (SOCAN) applied for a royalty tariff to the Copyright Board of Canada that would allow them to collect royalties for copyrighted materials transferred over the internet. In rebuttal, the Canadian Association of Internet Providers (CAIP) claimed that they served only as intermediaries and could not be held liable.

In 2002, the Federal Court of Appeal held that an ISP could rely on the "intermediary exception" found in section 2.4(1)(b) that absolved carriers who only pass information through their system from liability. However, this exception did not apply for caching of information as doing so was considered more than just relaying information. Thus an ISP who refuses to remove copyrighted material from its servers after given reasonable opportunity to do so could be held liable. Lastly, the Court of Appeal found that the tariff should not be limited to material originating from Canada alone.

Reasons of the court
The Court's opinion was written by Binnie J. with McLachlin C.J., Iacobucci, Major, Bastarache, Arbour, Deschamps and Fish JJ. concurring. A minority opinion was given by LeBel J.

Binnie
To begin, Binnie notes the huge capacity of the internet to disseminate knowledge and it should be encouraged; however, a balance is difficult to find.

Binnie first examined the applicability of the Copyright Act. It depends on whether there is a "real and substantial connection" between Canada and the transmission source, Binnie claims. This would mean that the Act applies to communications received in or originating from Canada.

Turning to the liability of the ISPs, Binnie examined the policy reason behind section 2.4(1)(b) of the Copyright Act ("intermediary exception"). He notes that its purpose is to encourage intermediaries to improve their operations without fear of infringement. Thus ISPs can benefit from the intermediary exception if they limit their role to one of "conduit" and do not perform any acts related to content. Moreover, an ISP must only provide "means" to communicate that are "necessary".
Binnie adopted the Board's broad meaning of the word "means" as including routers  and the accompanying software, hosting, and connectivity services.

Binnie examines the meaning of "necessary" as it applies to a provider's cache. He finds that a cache copy of a communication is content-neutral and is dictated by the technical requirements of the technology. Thus so long as it is for the purposes of "economy and efficiency" it does not make the role of the provider less of an intermediary. Therefore, an ISP can seek protection under section 2.4(1)(b) ("intermediary exception").

In concluding, Binnie notes that it is impossible to impute actual knowledge on an ISP of a copyright violation, and thus cannot impose liability. If an ISP received notice that

However, in obiter Binnie further suggested

LeBel
LeBel J. agreed with Binnie's conclusion but took issue with the test for determining the location of an internet communication under the Copyright Act (the "real and substantial connection" test). Rather, he agrees with the Copyright Board's decision to only apply to providers located in Canada. He finds the board's test to be more in-line with international treaties and diminishes privacy concerns.

See also
 List of Supreme Court of Canada cases (McLachlin Court)
 Théberge v Galerie d'Art du Petit Champlain Inc
 CCH Canadian Ltd v Law Society of Upper Canada

External links
 
 full text from Federal Court of Appeal decision
 summary of case at blakes.com

Supreme Court of Canada cases
Canadian copyright case law
2004 in Canadian case law